Sky Magazine (or 'Sky Mag') was a magazine distributed to subscribers of the BSkyB satellite service Sky Digital.

Availability
The magazine was available to subscribers of the Variety Pack or all packs of entertainment.

Content
The magazines content varied from edition to edition, but tended to will include:

  Interviews with celebrities.
  Television listings and guides for Sky Movies and Sports channels.
  Programme reviews and recommended viewing guides.
  Sky services, Adult channels and premium services advertising.
  Information regarding updates, price changes, etc..
  A newsletter called Sky Month to give tips on how to use Sky.

In its final years, popular consensus was that the quality of the content decreased. What was once a quality magazine had lost channel guides, detailed channel listings and more quality interviews and programme-related articles.

End of magazine
The magazine ceased publication in October 2011. The October/November edition was the final one. The publication was replaced by a weekly customer email newsletter with programming highlights.

References

2007 establishments in the United Kingdom
2011 disestablishments in the United Kingdom
Television magazines published in the United Kingdom
Defunct magazines published in the United Kingdom
Entertainment magazines
Magazines published in Ireland
Magazines established in 2007
Magazines disestablished in 2011
Sky Group